Betsy Struthers (born 1951) is a Canadian poet and novelist who lives in Peterborough, Ontario. She was co-editor (with Sarah Klassen) and contributor to Poets in the Classroom, an anthology of essays about teaching poetry workshops written by members of the League of Canadian Poets. She was president of the League from 1995 to 1997 and has served as chair of its Education Committee and Feminist Caucus. She works as a freelance editor of academic non-fiction texts. Her book Still won the 2004 Pat Lowther Award for the best book of poetry by a Canadian woman.

Works
Censored Letters (Mosaic Press, 1984), 
Saying So out Loud (Mosaic Press, 1988), 
Found: A Body (fiction) (Simon & Pierre, 1992), 
Running out of Time (Wolsak and Wynn, 1993), 
Grave Deeds (fiction) (Simon & Pierre, 1994), 
Poets in the Classroom (ed.) (Pembroke, 1995), 
A Studied Death (fiction) (Simon & Pierre, 1995), 
Virgin Territory (Wolsak & Wynn, 1996), 
Driven (Black Moss Press, 2000), 
Still (Black Moss Press, 2003), 
In Her Fifties (Black Moss Press, 2005),

See also

List of Canadian poets

References

1951 births
Canadian women novelists
Canadian women poets
Canadian feminist writers
Living people
Writers from Toronto
20th-century Canadian novelists
20th-century Canadian poets
20th-century Canadian women writers
21st-century Canadian novelists
21st-century Canadian poets
21st-century Canadian women writers